"The economy, stupid" is a phrase that was coined by James Carville in 1992. It is often quoted from a televised quip by Carville as 
"It’s the economy, stupid." Carville was a strategist in Bill Clinton's successful 1992 presidential campaign against incumbent George H. W. Bush. His phrase was directed at the campaign's workers and intended as one of three messages for them to focus on. The others were "Change vs. more of the same" and "Don't forget health care."

Clinton's campaign advantageously used the then-prevailing recession in the United States as one of the campaign's means to successfully unseat George H. W. Bush. In March 1991, days after the ground war in Kuwait, 90% of polled Americans approved of President Bush's job performance. But during the following year, Americans' opinions turned sharply; 64% of polled Americans disapproved of Bush's job performance in August 1992.

History
In order to keep the campaign on message, Carville hung a sign in Bill Clinton's Little Rock campaign headquarters that read:

Change vs. more of the same.
The economy, stupid
Don't forget health care.

Although the sign was intended for an internal audience of campaign workers, the second phrase became a de facto slogan for the Clinton election campaign.

Legacy
The phrase has become a snowclone repeated often in American political culture, usually starting with the word "it's" and with commentators sometimes using a different word in place of "economy". Examples include "It's the deficit, stupid!" "It's the corporation, stupid!" "It's the math, stupid!", and "It's the voters, stupid!"

See also
 List of United States political catchphrases
 The War Room
 Keep it simple, stupid

References

1992 United States presidential election
American political catchphrases
Snowclones
Bill Clinton
1992 neologisms